"Ab Khel Jamay Ga" was the official anthem of the 2017 Pakistan Super League, the second season of the Pakistan Super League. It was released on 1 January 2017 by HBL Pakistan and was written and sung by Ali Zafar.

Background and release 
In late-December 2016, Ali Zafar revealed that he was honoured to have been chosen again by Pakistan Cricket Board to write, compose and sing the anthem for PSL season II. "After last time's phenomenal response I assume the expectations will be much higher this year." he said further, "Last time (for PSL season I), it was just the beginning. This time, it's a bigger celebration." He told that the song he tried to make "not only celebrates the success of last year's achievement but also anticipates what's in store for the year to come."

The tournament news has been promoted by hashtag #AbKhelJamayGa on social media accounts of PSL. The song was initially released online on 1 January 2017, but then officially released again on 2 January 2017 with some change in background voice.

On 29 January 2017, HBL Pakistan released the music video, featuring Pakistani cricketers; Ramiz Raja, Shahid Afridi, Misbah-ul-Haq, Umar Gul and Ahmed Shehzad. Music video as well as audio with PSL logo in background of anthem was also uploaded on the official YouTube channel of Pakistan Super League.

Zafar also performed on reprised version of the song in the opening ceremony of PSL season II, in Dubai on 9 February 2017. He was also seen performing at closing ceremony in Lahore on 5 March 2017. He also performed on this anthem at closing ceremony of Pakistan Super League 2018.

See also 
List of Pakistan Super League anthems
Ali Zafar discography

References

External links 

2017 Pakistan Super League
2017
2017 songs
Ali Zafar songs